Parvat was City and a Municipality in Surat district in the Indian state of Gujarat.  The town is roughly 8 km from Surat. As in 2006 Eight Municipalities Amalgamated in Surat and Parvat is one of those which was added to Limbayat Zone.

Demographics
 India census, Parvat had a population of 20,694. Males constitute 59% of the population and females 41%. Parvat has an average literacy rate of 64%, higher than the national average of 59.5%: male literacy is 71%, and female literacy is 53%. In Parvat, 15% of the population is under 6 years of age.

See also 
List of tourist attractions in Surat

References

Suburban area of Surat
Cities and towns in Surat district